Kenan Malik (born 26 January 1960) is an Indian-born British writer, lecturer and broadcaster, trained in neurobiology and the history of science. As an academic author, his focus is on the philosophy of biology, and contemporary theories of multiculturalism, pluralism, and race. These topics are core concerns in The Meaning of Race (1996), Man, Beast and Zombie (2000) and Strange Fruit: Why Both Sides Are Wrong in the Race Debate (2008).

Malik's work contains a forthright defence of the values of the 18th-century Enlightenment, which he sees as having been distorted and misunderstood in more recent political and scientific thought. He was shortlisted for the Orwell Prize in 2010.

Career
Malik was born in Secunderabad, Telangana, India and brought up in Manchester, England. He studied neurobiology at the University of Sussex and History of Science at Imperial College, London. In between, he was a research psychologist at the Centre for Research into Perception and Cognition (CRPC) at the University of Sussex.

He has given lectures or seminars at a number of universities, including University of Cambridge (Department of Biological Anthropology); University of Oxford (St. Antony's College, Blavatnik School of Government and the Department for Continuing Education); the Institute of Historical Research, London; Goldsmiths College, University of London (Department of Social Anthropology); University of Liverpool (Department of Politics); Nottingham Trent University; University of Newcastle (Department of Social Policy and Sociology); University of Oslo; and the European University Institute, Florence. In 2003, he was a visiting fellow at the University of Melbourne. He is currently Senior Visiting Fellow at the University of Surrey.

As well as being a presenter of Analysis on BBC Radio 4, he has also presented Night Waves, Radio 3's Arts and Ideas magazine. Malik has written and presented a number of TV documentaries, including Disunited Kingdom (2003), Are Muslims Hated? (which was shortlisted for the Index on Censorship Freedom of Expression award, in 2005), Let 'Em All In (2005) and Britain's Tribal Tensions (2006). Strange Fruit was longlisted for the Royal Society Science Book Prize in 2009.

He has written for many newspapers and magazines, including The Guardian, Financial Times, The Independent, Independent on Sunday, Sunday Times, Sunday Telegraph, New Statesman, The New York Times, Prospect, TLS, The Times Higher Education Supplement, Nature, Rising East, Göteborgs-Posten, Bergens Tidende and Handelsblatt. He is a Fellow of the Royal Society of Arts.

Malik's main areas of academic interest are philosophy of biology and philosophy of mind, scientific method and epistemology, theories of human nature, science policy, bioethics, political philosophy, the history, philosophy and sociology of race, and the history of ideas.

Malik is a Distinguished Supporter of Humanists UK and a trustee of the free-speech magazine Index on Censorship.

Politics

Malik has long campaigned for equal rights, freedom of expression, and a secular society, and in defence of rationalism and humanism in the face of what he has called "a growing culture of irrationalism, mysticism and misanthropy".

In the 1980s, he was associated with a number of Marxist organisations, including the Socialist Workers Party (SWP) and the Revolutionary Communist Party (RCP), and Big Flame. 

He was the Red Front candidate in Nottingham East in the 1987 general election. He stood as the RCP's candidate in Birmingham Selly Oak in the general election in 1992, coming last out of six candidates with 84 votes (0.15%). He was also involved with anti-racist campaigns, including the Anti-Nazi League and East London Workers Against Racism. He helped organise street patrols in East London to protect Asian families against racist attacks and was a leading member of a number of campaigns against deportations and police brutality including the Newham 7 campaign, the Afia Begum Campaign Against Deportations, and the Colin Roach Campaign.
 
Malik has written that the turning point in his relationship with the left came with the Salman Rushdie affair. Much of his political campaigning over the past decade has been in defence of free speech, secularism and scientific rationalism. Malik was one of the first left-wing critics of multiculturalism, has controversially opposed restrictions on hate speech, supported open door policies on immigration, opposed the notion of animal rights in a series of debates with Peter Singer and Richard Ryder, and spoken out in defence of animal experimentation.

Malik wrote for the RCP's magazine Living Marxism, later LM. Although the RCP has since disbanded, Malik has written for later incarnations of LM, and for its online successor, the web magazine Spiked.

In a Guardian opinion piece published during the 2020 US presidential transition, Malik accused president-elect Joe Biden of grifting from his supporters.

Malik has written of his perception that use of white privilege narratives can further entrench white identity by marginalising white British working classes.

Malik commented on the controversy surrounding comments by Whoopi Goldberg in early2022 on the circumstances of The Holocaust and also notes at length that Nazi Germany, when embedding their distorted ideologies into law, drew on legal concepts from prevailing United States legislation.

Summary of select works

The Meaning of Race
The Meaning of Race examines the historical development, and philosophical and political roots, of the idea of race. It also explores the relationship between the idea of race and contemporary theories of multiculturalism and pluralism.

Malik argues that racial discourse and theories of racial difference arose in opposition to the universalist ideas of the Enlightenment, and gained their plausibility from "the persistence of differences of rank, class and peoples in a society that had accepted the concept of equality." (page 70) As the nineteenth century unfolded, the politically dominant classes appropriated science (particularly evolutionary theory) to support the idea of a natural order underlying social and economic inequalities, though nothing about the dynamic of science itself necessitated racial conclusions. Thus, "the discourse of race did not arise out of the categories of Enlightenment discourse but out of the relationship between Enlightenment thought and the social organisation of capitalism." (page 225)

The idea of race applied initially to class differences within European society, but was later applied to differences between Europeans and others, "and hence became marked by colour differences." (p. 8) In the twentieth century, racial theory was largely discredited by its association with Nazism, and the word "racism" entered the political vocabulary as a term of criticism, but the defeat of the Nazis led only to a recasting, not the destruction, of a belief in immutable differences among groups of human beings. This belief has been transferred to contemporary notions of culture.

As depicted by Malik, twentieth-century anthropological thought mistakenly divided humanity into integrated, holistic cultures that must be understood as static; such cultures must not be tampered with, since the nature of their harmonious functioning requires that they must "survive intact." (page 156). Malik sees this tendency in anthropology as another expression, along with the idea of race, of "a particularist, relativist, and anti-humanist philosophy" that has rejected Enlightenment universalism. (page 7) He opposes the "politics of difference" – the identification of competing social groups based on shared history and a sense of identity – believing it sets back the struggle for political and economic equality. The final chapters of The Meaning of Race contain a critique of postmodernist and poststructuralist theories, including the views of Edward Said. Here, Malik argues that such theories misinterpret the relationship between the West and other cultures, and are detrimental to the possibility of social equality. In its essence, Malik argues, postmodernism is defeatist – it is prepared to accept a place for marginalised groups within society without demanding true equality.

Man, Beast and Zombie
Man, Beast and Zombie investigates the historical roots, philosophical assumptions and alleged methodological problems of contemporary theories of human nature, in particular evolutionary psychology and cognitive science. He argues that, "The triumph of mechanistic explanations of human nature is as much the consequence of our culture's loss of nerve as it is of scientific advance." (pages 13–14) While rejecting epistemic relativism, with its denial of an objective truth about the world, Malik insists that scientific theories of human nature are, in practice, shaped by cultural influences, as well as being responsive to data. He argues that the scientific study of human nature has been distorted by post-war cultural pessimism. In examining evolutionary psychology and related theories, Malik distinguishes between these theories, which he sees as a form of universal Darwinism (attributing explanatory power to Darwinian theory in a wide range of domains), and the work of "circumspect Darwinists" (who are cautious about its explanatory power) (197).

Though Malik sees human beings as a product of evolution, and that universal Darwinist theories have merit when applied to non-human animals – and perhaps some merit when applied to human behaviour – he is sceptical about how far they can be applied to human beings. In particular, theories of a biologically-evolved human nature cannot, alone, account for the transformations of behaviour that arose from our immersion in a symbolic world built up out of language and culturally-meaningful relationships. Thus, "the scientific tools with which we investigate animal behaviour are inadequate for understanding human behaviour" (p. 231).

In discussing cognitive science and philosophy of mind, Malik concludes that each human being possesses "an extended mind"; a brain becomes a human mind only by its immersion in social relationships together with "other brains linked by language and culture." (p. 331) Human meaning derives not from nature but from the language-linked social network of which we are part." (p. 334) If we did succeed in creating a machine capable of participating in a human society like a human being, it would be human (334–35).

In the final chapter of Man, Beast and Zombie, Malik laments what he sees as an increasing reluctance to view individual people as autonomous, rational, and competent agents, and a tendency to view them as damaged, weak, incapable, and possessing limited control over their fates. All this has both encouraged and been reinforced by what Malik sees as mechanistic accounts of human nature. It has been accompanied by a shift of emphasis from negative liberty to positive liberties and paternalistic protections, and by an acceptance of limits to human possibilities and a deference to "nature" – all in marked contrast to the spirit of Enlightenment humanism.

Strange Fruit
Strange Fruit: Why Both Sides Are Wrong in the Race Debate (Oneworld, 2008) is a book focusing on the anti-enlightenment dichotomy of racial science and anti-racism and critiques both. Malik argues that racial scientists should be allowed to express their views publicly and be critiqued in the public domain, while also criticising censorship from traditional anti-racist organisations. Most of the book focuses on science and race, and whether race can tell us anything about humans – he argues for a third way. He argues that 'race' may be a poor man's clue to many things like genetic disease in populations, but that this does not have anything to do with 'race' in and of itself. He also argues that 'race' may be an obvious indicator of populations of genetics within multi-ethnic countries, but it is not exclusive to 'races' as a whole.

The book also critiques multicultural paradigms about identity and cultural inheritance. Malik concludes that 'race' is not a biological concept and is useless as a way to separate people and he says that it is not just ignorant racial scientists that perpetuate this myth, it is anti-racists too.

From Fatwa to Jihad: The Rushdie Affair and Its Legacy
From Fatwa to Jihad was released to coincide with the 20th anniversary of the Fatwa placed on Rushdie. In his analysis Malik documents the events surrounding the Bradford protests, the fatwa, the riots in India and the government and media response. Malik also explores the life of immigration from the Indian subcontinent to Britain and how that has shaped modern British-Asian identity. He also documents and critiques the rise of state multiculturalism and the long-term effects on cities like Birmingham. Coupled with an analysis of the culture of self-censorship and fear of today's media, the book provides an account of the fatwa's present-day impact.

Awards
Fellow, Royal Society of Arts
Distinguished Supporter, Humanists UK
Shortlisted for George Orwell Book Prize, 2010, for From Fatwa to Jihad: The Rushdie Affair and Its Legacy
3QD Politics and Social Science Prize, 2013, for essay "Rethinking the Idea of 'Christian Europe'"

Works
The Meaning of Race: Race, History and Culture in Western Society (Palgrave / New York University Press, 1996)
Man, Beast and Zombie: What Science Can and Cannot Tell Us About Human Nature (Weidenfeld & Nicolson, 2000; Rutgers University Press, 2002)
Strange Fruit: Why Both Sides are Wrong in the Race Debate (Oneworld, 2008)
From Fatwa to Jihad: The Rushdie Affair and Its Legacy (Atlantic Books, 2009)
Multiculturalism and Its Discontents: Rethinking Diversity After 9/11 (Seagull Books, 2013)
The Quest for a Moral Compass: A Global History of Ethics (Atlantic Books, 2014)

References

External links

 Personal website
 Pandaemonium blog
 "Bad bargain made in the mosque" by Kenan Malik, The Times, 6 July 2006
 "The Colour-Coded Prescription", transcript, presenter Kenan Malik, Analysis, BBC, 17 November 2005
 Globe of the World, transcript, presenter Kenan Malik, Analysis, BBC, 16 March 2006
 "What hate? - Muslims believe they are under attack from all sides. But racial abuse is being exaggerated to stifle critics of Islam by Kenan Malik, The Guardian, 7 January 2005
 "Multiculturalism and the road to terror", essay by Kenan Malik, Handelsblatt, 3 January 2006, published at kenanmalik.com
 Islamophobia myth, essay by Kenan Malik, Prospect Magazine, February 2005, published at communautarisme.net
 "Too much respect: Liberals argue that a more diverse society requires less diverse opinion. Nonsense", essay by Kenan Malik, Prospect Magazine, 23 March 2006, published at freethinktank.com
 "What is it to be human?", Talk given as part of a debate with Susan Blackmore entitled 'Flesh not Meat: Are we more than matter?' at the Institute of Contemporary Arts, London, 5 December 2000
 Video (and audio) of interview/discussion with Kenan Malik by Kerry Howley on Bloggingheads.tv

1960 births
Living people
Alumni of the University of Sussex
Alumni of Imperial College London
Academics of the University of Sussex
BBC radio presenters
British writers of Indian descent
Writers from Telangana
Critics of postmodernism
English male journalists
English humanists
English neuroscientists
English activists
English broadcasters
English philosophers
English radio presenters
Historians of science
Indian emigrants to England
Revolutionary Communist Party (UK, 1978) members
British science journalists
People associated with The Institute for Cultural Research
Writers from Manchester
People from Secunderabad
Naturalised citizens of the United Kingdom
Articles containing video clips
British republicans